The following outline is provided as an overview of and topical guide to Kyoto:

Kyoto – capital city of Kyoto Prefecture, located in the Kansai region of Japan. It is most well known in Japanese history for being the former Imperial capital of Japan for more than one thousand years, as well as a major part of the Kyoto-Osaka-Kobe metropolitan area.

General reference 
 Pronunciation: , ;
 Common English name(s): Kyoto
 Official English name(s): Kyoto
 Adjectival(s): 
 Demonym(s):

Geography of Kyoto 

Geography of Kyoto
 Kyoto is:
 a city
 capital of the Kyoto Prefecture
 Population of Kyoto: 1,472,027
 Area of Kyoto: 827.83 km2 (319.63 sq mi)
 Atlas of Kyoto

Location of Kyoto 

 Kyoto is situated within the following regions:
 Northern Hemisphere and Eastern Hemisphere
 Eurasia
 Asia (outline)
 East Asia
 Japan (outline)
 Honshu island
 Kyoto Prefecture
 Greater Kyoto
 Time zone(s): 
 Japan Standard Time (UTC+09)

Environment of Kyoto 

 Climate of Kyoto

Natural geographic features of Kyoto 

 Canals in Kyoto
 Takase River
 Mountains in Kyoto
 Mount Hiei
 Rivers in Kyoto
 Kamo River
 Katsura River
 Uji River

Areas of Kyoto

Districts of Kyoto 

 Arashiyama
 Gion
 Kamishichiken
 Nishijin
 Shijō Kawaramachi

Neighborhoods in Kyoto 

 Katsura

Locations in Kyoto 

 Tourist attractions in Kyoto
 Museums in Kyoto
 Shopping areas and markets
 Thirteen Buddhist Sites of Kyoto
 World Heritage Sites in Kyoto
 Historic Monuments of Ancient Kyoto

Bridges in Kyoto 

Bridges in Kyoto
 Sanjō Ōhashi

Cultural and exhibition centers in Kyoto 

 Kyoto International Conference Center

Monuments and memorials in Kyoto 

 Mimizuka
 Ryozen Kannon

Museums and art galleries in Kyoto 

Museums in Kyoto

 Hosomi Museum
 Kitamura Museum
 Koryo Museum of Art 
 Kyoto Art Center
 Kyoto City Archaeological Museum 
 Kyoto City Library of Historical Documents
 Kyoto International Manga Museum
 Kyoto Municipal Museum of Art
 Kyoto Museum for World Peace
 Kyoto National Museum
 Kyoto Railway Museum
 Museum of Furuta Oribe
 National Museum of Modern Art
 Nomura Art Museum
 Ōkōchi Sansō
 Ōtani University Museum
 Ryozen Museum of History 
 Sen-oku Hakuko Kan
 Shigureden
 Toei Kyoto Studio Park

Palaces and villas in Kyoto 

 Fushimi Castle
 Golden Tea Room
 Heian Palace
 Jurakudai
 Kyoto Imperial Palace
 Chrysanthemum Throne
 Katsura Imperial Villa
 Nijō Castle
 Nightingale floor

Parks and gardens in Kyoto 

 Bamboo Forest
 Iwatayama Monkey Park
 Kyoto Botanical Garden
 Kyoto Gyoen National Garden
 Maruyama Park
 Murin-an
 Sentō Imperial Palace
 Shugakuin Imperial Villa
 Toei Kyoto Studio Park

Religious buildings in Kyoto 

Buddhist temples and Shinto shrines in Kyoto

 Anrakuju-in
 Chishaku-in
 Daigo-ji
 Daikaku-ji
 Daisen-in
 Fushimi Inari-taisha
 Ginkaku-ji
 Heian Shrine
 Kamigamo Shrine
 Kamo Shrine
 Kinkaku-ji
 Kitano Tenmangū
 Kiyomizu-dera
 Kōzan-ji
 Matsunoo-taisha
 Nishi Hongan-ji
 Ryōan-ji
 Saihō-ji
 Sanbō-in
 Tenryū-ji
 Tō-ji

Secular buildings in Kyoto 

 Funaoka Onsen
 Ichiriki Chaya
 Kyoto Prefectural Library

Streets in Kyoto 

 Karasuma Street
 Kawaramachi Street
 Kiyamachi Street
 Philosopher's Walk
 Shijō Street
 Teramachi Street

Theatres in Kyoto 

 Minami-za

Towers in Kyoto 

 Kyoto Tower

Demographics of Kyoto 

Demographics of Kyoto

Government and politics of Kyoto 

Government and politics of Kyoto
 Wards of Kyoto
 Mayors of Kyoto
 2008 Kyoto mayoral election
 2012 Kyoto mayoral election
 International relations of Kyoto
 Sister cities of Kyoto
  Boston, Massachusetts, United States (1959)
  Cologne, Germany (1963)
  Florence, Italy (1965)
  Kyiv, Ukraine (1971)
  Prague, Czech Republic (1996)

History of Kyoto

History of Kyoto

History of Kyoto, by period or event 

Timeline of Kyoto

 Early history
 Kyoto during the Middle Ages – Kyoto becomes the  official capital of Japan (794)
 Imperial Court in Kyoto (794–1868)
 Modern Kyoto

History of Kyoto, by subject

Culture of Kyoto 

Culture of Kyoto

Arts in Kyoto

Music of Kyoto 

 Composers and musicians of Kyoto
 Teizo Matsumura
 Music venues in Kyoto
 Kyoto Concert Hall
 ROHM Theatre Kyoto

Visual arts of Kyoto 

 Hara school of painters
 Kyoto school
 Kyoto ware
 Awata ware
 Kiyomizu ware

Cuisine of Kyoto
 Obanzai
 Yatsuhashi

Events in Kyoto

 Ikenobo Autumn Tanabata Exhibition
 Kyoto Hemp Forum

Festivals in Kyoto

 Aoi Matsuri
 Gion Matsuri
 Gozan no Okuribi
 Jidai Matsuri

Languages of Kyoto
 Kansai dialect

Media in Kyoto
 Newspapers in Kyoto
Kyoto Journal
Kyoto Shimbun
 Radio and television in Kyoto
 Kyoto Broadcasting System

Philosophy of Kyoto 

 Kyoto School

Religion in Kyoto 

Religion in Kyoto
 Buddhism in Kyoto
 Christianity in Kyoto
St. Agnes Cathedral
 Catholicism in Kyoto 
Roman Catholic Diocese of Kyoto
St. Francis Xavier Cathedral
 Shinto in Kyoto

Sports in Kyoto 

Sports in Kyoto
 Baseball in Kyoto
 Shochiku Robins
 Football in Kyoto
 Association football in Kyoto
Kyoto Sanga FC
 Sports competitions in Kyoto
 Kyoto Marathon
 Shimadzu All Japan Indoor Tennis Championships
 Sports venues in Kyoto
 Kyoto Racecourse
 Nishikyogoku Athletic Stadium

Economy and infrastructure of Kyoto 

Economy of Kyoto
 Financial services in Kyoto
 Bank of Kyoto
 Hotels in Kyoto
 Restaurants and cafés in Kyoto
 Salon de thé François
 Tai-an
 Shopping malls and markets in Kyoto
 Æon Mall Kyoto Gojō
 Nishiki Market
 Tourism in Kyoto

Transportation in Kyoto 

Public transport in Kyoto
 Public transport operators in Kyoto
 Kyoto Municipal Transportation Bureau
 Air transport in Kyoto
 Airports in Kyoto
 Road transport in Kyoto
 Bus transport in Kyoto
TOSA Flash Mobility, Clean City, Smart Bus
 Cycling in Kyoto

Rail transport in Kyoto 

Rail transport in Kyoto
  Kyoto Municipal Subway
  Karasuma Line
  Tōzai Line
 Railway stations in Kyoyo
 Kyōto Station
 Ōmiya Station
 Sanjō Station

Education in Kyoto 

Education in Kyoto

 Universities in Kyoto
 Doshisha University
 Kyoto Institute of Technology
 Kyoto University
 Kyoto City University of Arts
 Ryukoku University
 Research institutes in Kyoto
 International Research Center for Japanese Studies
 Yamashina Botanical Research Institute

See also 

 Outline of geography

References

External links 

Kyoto
Kyoto